Schlatt bei Winterthur is a municipality in the district of Winterthur in the canton of Zürich in Switzerland.

Geography
Of this area, 47.9% is used for agricultural purposes, while 45.5% is forested. Of the rest of the land, 5.6% is settled (buildings or roads) and the remainder (1%) is non-productive (rivers, glaciers or mountains).   housing and buildings made up 2.8% of the total area, while transportation infrastructure made up the rest (2.9%). Of the total unproductive area, water (streams and lakes) made up 0.6% of the area. , 3% of the total municipal area was undergoing some type of construction.

Demographics
, 5.3% of the population was made up of foreign nationals.   the gender distribution of the population was 51.4% male and 48.6% female. Over the last 10 years the population has grown at a rate of 12.6%. Most of the population speaks German  (96.4%), with Italian being second most common ( 1.0%) and Dutch being third ( 1.0%).

In the 2007 election the most popular party was the SVP which received 49.6% of the vote.  The next three most popular parties were the CSP (12.5%), the SPS (11.4%) and the Green Party (11%).

The age distribution of the population is children and teenagers (0–19 years old) make up 27.4% of the population, while adults (20–64 years old) make up 59.8% and seniors (over 64 years old) make up 12.8%.  In Schlatt about 85.3% of the population (between age 25–64) have completed either non-mandatory upper secondary education or additional higher education (either university or a Fachhochschule).  There are 224 households in Schlatt.

Schlatt has an unemployment rate of 1.34%.  , there were 69 people employed in the primary economic sector and about 28 businesses involved in this sector.  36 people are employed in the secondary sector and there are 8 businesses in this sector.  48 people are employed in the tertiary sector, with 13 businesses in this sector.   46% of the working population were employed full-time, and 54% were employed part-time.

 there were 94 Catholics and 440 Protestants in Schlatt. In the 2000 census, religion was broken down into several smaller categories. Of the rest of the population, 0% were Muslim, 0.8% belonged to another religion (not listed), 1.1% did not give a religion, and 10.2% were atheist or agnostic.

References

External links

 Official website 

Municipalities of the canton of Zürich